Tsuga diversifolia, commonly known as the northern Japanese hemlock, or in Japanese, kometsuga (米栂), is a species of conifer native to the Japanese islands of Honshū, Kyūshū, and Shikoku. In Europe and North America, the species is sometimes employed as tree for the garden and has been in cultivation since 1861.

Description
The crown is narrow, dense and conical. Young shoots are short, palely pubescent and bright orange to red-brown in colour. They are a dark green in colour, glossy and furrowed above with two chalk white stomatal bands below.

The bark is an orange-brown in colour, shallowly fissured and vertically peeling. The buds are a deep purple red. The dull purple, ovoid pistillate flowers are terminal on either long or short shoots. They are dark brown, pendulous and the scales are slightly convex and ridged.

References

External links
 

diversifolia
Trees of Japan
Endemic flora of Japan
Least concern plants